Cresto may refer to:

 Monte Cresto, a peak of the Province of Biella, in Piedmont, Italy

People 

 Gilles Cresto, a Monegasque archer
 Mayda Cresto, an Argentine lawyer, notary and politician
 Sergio Cresto, an American Italian rally driver

See also 
 Cresta (disambiguation)